Peace by Chocolate is a Syrian-Canadian chocolatier company, based in Antigonish, Nova Scotia, Canada. Prior to being forced to flee from Syria during the country's civil war in 2012, the company's CEO and Founder Tareq Hadhad’s father, Essam Hadhad made chocolate in Damascus, Syria for over 20 years.
After immigrating to Nova Scotia in 2016, Tareq Hadhad reopened the family's chocolatier business. Its confectionery is shipped worldwide. 

On March 5, 2021, Peace by Chocolate expanded by adding a storefront along the Halifax Waterfront.

History
Chocolate-making has been a Hadhad family tradition since 1986 when Essam Hadhad, Tareq's father, opened a factory in Damascus.
The Hadhad family's chocolate-making facilities in Syria were bombed, and they were forced to leave their home and live as refugees in Lebanon for three years, living in uncertainty about their safety and their future until arriving in Antigonish, Nova Scotia, in 2016.
Upon arriving in Canada, the Hadhad's were determined to continue their confectionery business by launching a facility in Antigonish. 

Founder Tareq Hadhad wrote a book about his journey. In September 2020, Hadhad won a  National Entrepreneurship Awards for his positive impact as a new Canadian, and was one of the recipients of the Top 25 Canadian Immigrant Awards of 2020.

A film adaptation of the family's story, also called Peace by Chocolate, premiered at the Tribeca Film Festival in 2021.

In 2022, Tareq Hadhad was named as a panelist on Canada Reads, advocating for Omar El Akkad's novel What Strange Paradise.

References 

Canadian chocolate companies

Food and drink companies based in Nova Scotia
Syrian Canadian